Per Johan Niklas Wallenlind (born 21 November 1968) is a retired track and field athlete from Sweden, who competed in the men's 400 metres hurdles event. He won the bronze medal at the 1990 European Championships in Split, Yugoslavia. His personal best was 48.35, achieved on 5 August 1992 in the final of the men's 400 m hurdles at the 1992 Summer Olympics in Barcelona, Spain.

Achievements

References
 Profile
 sports-reference

1968 births
Living people
Swedish male hurdlers
Athletes (track and field) at the 1992 Summer Olympics
Olympic athletes of Sweden
Athletes from Gothenburg
European Athletics Championships medalists